The Textile Bowl is the name given to the Clemson–NC State football rivalry. It is an American college football rivalry game played annually by the Clemson Tigers football team of Clemson University and the NC State Wolfpack football team of North Carolina State University.

History
The rivalry game has been known as the Textile Bowl since 1981. The two universities are founding members of the Atlantic Coast Conference (ACC), and both have competed in the ACC's Atlantic Division since the conference initiated divisional play. The rivalry's name is derived from the fact that Clemson and North Carolina State have two of the largest university-level textile schools in the world, and from the textile industry's historic importance in the economic development of their respective states of South Carolina and North Carolina.

The rivalry is usually considered good-natured due to how similar the two universities are in terms of mission, academics, and fans. The rivalry has been played annually since 1971.

In the days and weeks leading up to the game each year, both universities host special programs and events promoting each other's textile programs. In recent years, students from Clemson go on visits of the North Carolina State campus in Raleigh, NC and vice versa.

Even though the rivalry has lost some luster at the national level, compared to NC State's local rivalries with the [[North Carolina Tar Heels], the Duke Blue Devils, and the Wake Forest Demon Deacons, and Clemson's rivalries with the South Carolina Gamecocks, the Georgia Bulldogs, and the Florida State Seminoles it still holds a lot of significance for alumni and for the communities surrounding the colleges.

The game was continuously played from 1971-2019, however due to the COVID-19 pandemic in the United States, the ACC shifted to a 10 game conference schedule for the 2020 season. 2020 was the first time since 1969-1970 that the Wolfpack and Tigers did not play. In 2021, the Wolfpack beat the Tigers 27-21 in double overtime, securing their first win in the series since 2011. This loss knocked Clemson out of a spot in the College Football Playoff. NC State controlled their own destiny in the ACC Atlantic before suffering losses to Miami and Wake Forest. Wake Forest ultimately won the ACC Atlantic for the first time since 2006. In 2022, both teams came in with 4-0 records and were both ranked in the Top 10 (Clemson at #5 and NC State at #10, respectively) with ESPN College GameDay making an appearance in Clemson. Clemson was coming off of a scare from Wake Forest (the Tigers narrowly won 51-45 in double overtime in a high-scoring shootout), while NC State was coming off of a 41-10 thrashing of UConn. Ultimately the Tigers got their revenge on the Wolfpack and won 30-20; Clemson ultimately won the ACC Atlantic as NC State and Wake Forest had surprising late-season collapses, but the Tigers did not get a Playoff spot as a result of their two losses to non-conference opponents Notre Dame and rival South Carolina.

Game results

See also  
 List of NCAA college football rivalry games

References

 

College football rivalries in the United States
Clemson Tigers football
NC State Wolfpack football